The SS Leland Stanford was a Liberty ship built for service in World War II.

Namesake
The ship was named for Amasa Leland Stanford, California governor, president of the Central Pacific Railroad, and founder of Stanford University.

Construction
SS Leland Stanford was the 53rd ship launched by the California Shipbuilding Corporation, at Long Beach, California. She was launched 42 days after her keel was laid.

Sponsor
The sponsor of the ship was Mrs. Neil Petree, secretary of the Stanford Women's Club of Los Angeles. Her maid of honor was her daughter, Virginia Petree. Mrs. Petree, formerly Vera Margaret Thomas, took her A.B. degree at Stanford in 1918.

Service
She was operated by the Coastwise Line under a  charter with the Maritime Commission and War Shipping Administration. The need for transporting German prisoners to America from North Africa caused many cargo ships including many Liberty ships to be converted with five-tier bunks as well as facilities to provide food, water, environmental controls and sanitation. Around 550 could be accommodated. These arrangements were retained for use in transporting American troops later in the war. Leland Stanford was one of those temporarily modified.

The Leland Stanford carried troops to Oran, Algeria, in 1943.

The ship ran aground on 19 January 1944 on Hen and Chickens Shoal off of Cape Henlopen, Delaware, in zero visibility. The USS Allegheny responded and for two days unsuccessfully attempted to unground the vessel before being called away to a more severe disaster, the collision and fire of the MV Plattsburg Socony and the Liberty ship SS Charles Henderson. Finally the Leland Stanford worked herself loose without further assistance.

On the night of 24 November 1945, the Leland Stanford went aground on the Goodwin Sands off of Kent, at the northern end of the strait of Dover. The ship, carrying some 500 homeward-bound American troops, was refloated early 25 November with the aid of tugs. [Note - another source cites a 1 November 1945 grounding that caused damage but only gives the location as the NE Atlantic Ocean.]

Fate
The Leland Stanford was scrapped at Oakland, California, in 1967.

References

Liberty ships
Ships built in California
Long Beach, California
1942 ships
World War II merchant ships of the United States
Standard ship types of the United States